Kijowiec-Szyszynek  is a village in the administrative district of Gmina Ślesin, within Konin County, Greater Poland Voivodeship, in west-central Poland.

The village has a population of 33.

References

Kijowiec-Szyszynek